is a Japanese rugby union player who plays as a Centre. He currently plays for Suntory Sungoliath in Top League.

International
Japan head coach Jamie Joseph has named Shunsuke Asaoka in a 52-man training squad ahead of British and Irish Lions test.

References

1997 births
Living people
Rugby union centres
Sunwolves players
Japanese rugby union players
Japan international rugby union players
Rugby union wings
Tokyo Sungoliath players
21st-century Japanese people